Roger Rondeaux (15 April 1920 – 24 January 1999) was a French cyclo-cross cyclist, who was a professional from 1947 to 1958. Rondeaux won the World Cyclo-cross Championships three times in 1951, 1952, and 1953, and was the French national champion seven times between 1947 and 1954. Rondeaux had been beaten in the first edition of the Cyclo-cross world championships by Jean Robic in a sprint.

References

1920 births
1999 deaths
French male cyclists
Cyclo-cross cyclists
UCI Cyclo-cross World Champions (men)
Sportspeople from Marne (department)
Cyclists from Grand Est